Carl Ewald von Rönne (15 December 1663 – 29 December 1716) was a German-born Russian cavalry officer.  His service started in 1675 and he rose eventually to be General of the Cavalry in the Russian army of Peter the Great. He served in both the Great Northern War and in the Russo-Turkish War (1710–11).

References

Russian generals
1663 births
1716 deaths